The Impossible Woman is a 1936 German romance film directed by Johannes Meyer and starring Dorothea Wieck, Gustav Fröhlich and Gina Falckenberg. It was shot at the Johannisthal Studios in Berlin and partly on location in Romania. It was based on the novel Madame will nicht heiraten by Mia Fellmann.

Synopsis
The female head of an oil company is known for her aloof manner, and is known as an "impossible woman" by her employees. Eventually, she falls in love with one of her engineers, who has rescued the company from industrial sabotage.

Cast
 Dorothea Wieck as Ileana Manescu
 Gustav Fröhlich as Ingenieur Wiegand
 Gina Falckenberg as Mignon
 Edwin Jürgensen as Maravella
 Paul Henckels as Möller
 Harry Hardt as Director Kiriak
 Willi Schur as Dobre - Werkmeister
 Karl Hannemann as Roman - Bohrmeister
 Emil Höfer as Nicu
 Katja Specht as Mitza
 Wilhelm König as Ingenieur Jonescu
 Eduard Bornträger as Banu - Prokurist
 Gerhard Dammann as Ein Briefträger
 Fred Becker as Dancer
 Gertrud Weiß as Dancer
 Hugo Flink
 Adolf Gondrell
 Charlotte Hasse
 Heinrich Krill
 Max Maschek
 Kitty Meinhardt
 Günther Meyer
 Arthur Reinhardt
 Willi Rose
 Margarete Sachse
 Nico Turoff

References

Bibliography

External links 
 

1936 films
German romance films
1930s romance films
1930s German-language films
Films directed by Johannes Meyer
Films shot in Romania
Films based on German novels
Films of Nazi Germany
Films with screenplays by Thea von Harbou
Cine-Allianz films
German black-and-white films
1930s German films
Films shot at Johannisthal Studios